A list films produced in Pakistan in 1997 (see 1997 in film) and in the Urdu language:

1997

See also
1997 in Pakistan

External links
 Search Pakistani film - IMDB.com

1997
Pakistani
Films